Tipsoo Lake, at an elevation of  above sea level, is an alpine lake within the Northern Cascade Range near the summit of Chinook Pass in Pierce County, Washington.

The area is popular with photographers as the shores and surrounding area abound with the vibrant yellow, orange and purple colors of huckleberry, lupine, Indian paintbrush, and Partridgefoot. There are several hiking trails near the lake that vary in degrees of difficulty and that have views of Mount Rainier, Yakima Peak, and the surrounding landscape.

References

Gallery

Lakes of Washington (state)
Lakes of Pierce County, Washington
Mount Rainier National Park
Protected areas of Pierce County, Washington